Fr. Lawrence Lovasik, SVD was born on June 22, 1913 in Tarentum, Pennsylvania. He attended primary school at Saint Clement School before continuing on to Divine Word minor seminary and college in Girard, Pennsylvania. In 1962 he published his work "The Hidden Power of Kindness" (El Poder Oculto de la Amabilidad). He graduated in 1931.

Father Lovasik then entered the Divine Word Major Seminary in Techny, Illinois, where he graduated in 1938. After completing his theological studies at the Pontifical Gregorian University in Rome, Father Lovasik was ordained a missionary priest of the Society of the Divine Word on August 14, 1938.

Father Lovasik spent several years as a teacher and Prefect of Seminarians for the Society of the Divine Word. For over forty years, he preached parish missions throughout the Eastern United States and conducted retreats throughout the world.

In 1954, Father Lovasik founded the Sisters of the Divine Spirit, a missionary congregation of women religious. In 1967, he founded the Family Service Corps, a secular institute devoted to charitable work for the sick, elderly and needy.

Father Lovasik said his life's ideal was to make God more known and loved through his writings. He published more than 30 books and over 75 pamphlets including prayer books, Bible stories for children, lives of the saints, and catechisms. This includes the Saint Joseph Confirmation Book.

Father Lovasik retired from missionary work in 1982. He died on June 9, 1986.

References 

1913 births
1986 deaths
People from Tarentum, Pennsylvania
American people of Slovak descent
American Roman Catholic missionaries
Founders of Catholic religious communities